Commander Donald Cameron, VC (18 March 1916 – 10 April 1961) was a Scottish sailor and a recipient of the Victoria Cross, the highest award for gallantry in the face of the enemy that can be awarded to British and Commonwealth forces. He is one of three VC recipients from the small town of Carluke in South Lanarkshire (population 14,000). The Rotary Club of Carluke have erected a millennium stone in the town market place to commemorate this.

Naval career
Cameron served in the Merchant Navy from the age of 17. He was 27 years old, and a lieutenant in the Royal Naval Reserve during the Second World War, when the following deed took place for which he was awarded the VC.

On 22 September 1943 at Kåfjord on the Altafjord, North Norway, Lieutenant Cameron, commanding Midget Submarine X.6, and another lieutenant (Basil Charles Godfrey Place) commanding Midget Submarine X.7, carried out a most daring and successful attack on the German Battleship Tirpitz. The small submarines had to travel at least 1,000 miles from base, negotiate a minefield, dodge nets, gun defences and enemy listening posts. Having eluded all these hazards they finally placed the charges underneath the ship where they went off an hour later, doing so much damage that the Tirpitz was out of action for months.

The full citation was published in a supplement to The London Gazette of 18 February 1944 (dated 22 February 1944) and read:

Personal life
Cameron married WRNS's member Eve Kilpatrick in 1940 and they had four children. Cameron's health deteriorated in the last years of his life and he was eventually admitted to Royal Hospital Haslar, Gosport, where he died on 10 April 1961. His remains were cremated at Portchester and buried at sea from submarine  on 13 April 1961.

References

External links
Location of grave and VC medal (Hampshire)

1916 births
1961 deaths
British World War II recipients of the Victoria Cross
Burials at sea
People from Carluke
Royal Naval Reserve personnel
Royal Navy officers of World War II
Royal Navy recipients of the Victoria Cross
Royal Navy submarine commanders